The flag of Rakhine State is a bicolour of white and red, charged with the Shrivatsa, a historical symbol of Arakan, on a blue disk in the centre. The bicolour of the flag has been adopted by various ethnic-Rakhine organisations and political parties, often with different symbols in the centre.

Flag variants

References 

Rakhine State
Flags of Myanmar
Rakhine